Ricardo José Belli (born 10 September 1986) is a Brazilian football manager, currently in charge of Palmeiras (women).

Career

Born in Vinhedo but raised in Louveira, both in the São Paulo state, Belli began his career as a fitness coach in the youth sides of Santos. In 2010, he spent a short period as an assistant of Fernando Diniz at Paulista, before spending the following year back in his hometown working in a social project sponsored by Umbro.

In November 2012, Belli was named the under-20 manager of Guaçuano. The following February, he took over the under-20 side of Rio Branco-SP, before moving to Portugal in July and spending a period in the youth sides of Académica de Coimbra.

In August 2014, Belli was named manager of the under-19 side of Sport Lisboa e Marinha. He returned to his home country in 2016, and took over the under-20s of Atibaia in November of that year.

Belli returned to Paulista in March 2017, now as manager of the under-20 team.

On 24 July 2019, Belli was named manager of the women's team of Verdão. He departed the club on 9 November 2021, and later returned to men's football after being in charge of the under-20 side of Ituano.

Belli returned to Palmeiras and its women's team on 16 July 2022.

Honours
Palmeiras
: 2019, 2021
Copa Libertadores Femenina: 2022
Campeonato Paulista de Futebol Feminino: 2022

References

1986 births
Living people
Sportspeople from São Paulo (state)
Brazilian football managers
Sociedade Esportiva Palmeiras (women) managers